Robert Stinson (born November 8, 1932) is an American sailor. He competed in the 5.5 Metre event at the 1956 Summer Olympics.  He graduated from Princeton University and Harvard Business School.

References

External links
 

1932 births
Living people
American male sailors (sport)
Olympic sailors of the United States
Sailors at the 1956 Summer Olympics – 5.5 Metre
Sportspeople from Baltimore
Princeton University alumni
Harvard Business School alumni